The 1988 Baylor Bears football team represented the Baylor University in the 1988 NCAA Division I-A football season. The Bears finished the season fourth in the Southwest Conference. Baylor Stadium's name was officially changed to Floyd Casey Stadium during halftime of the homecoming game against Arkansas on November 5.

Schedule

After the season
The following players were drafted into professional football following the season.

References

Baylor
Baylor Bears football seasons
Baylor Bears football